Appleton Adams Mason (June 11, 1880 – December 20, 1938) was an American football player, coach of football and basketball, and physical education instructor.  He served as the head football coach at Warrensburg Teachers College—now the University of Central Missouri (1908–1909), Tulane University (1910–1912), and New York University (1918), compiling a career college football record of 15–23–4.  Mason was also the head basketball coach Warrensburg Teachers from 1908 to 1910 and at Tulane for the 1912–13 season, tallying a career college basketball mark of 23–13.  He was born in Parrsboro, Nova Scotia, and died on December 20, 1938, in the New Rochelle Hospital in New Rochelle, New York.

Involvement in Camp Agawam
Mason was the founder of Camp Agawam in Raymond, Maine. He founded the camp in 1919.  Mason went to Crescent Lake in Raymond every summer. Following his death in 1938, he was succeeded as camp director in 1939 by his son, Appleton Mason, Jr.

Head coaching record

Football

References

1880 births
1938 deaths
Central Missouri Mules and Jennies athletic directors
Central Missouri Mules basketball coaches
Central Missouri Mules football coaches
NYU Violets football coaches
Springfield Pride football players
Tulane Green Wave athletic directors
Tulane Green Wave football coaches
Tulane Green Wave men's basketball coaches
College men's track and field athletes in the United States
People from Cumberland County, Nova Scotia
People from Raymond, Maine